Etsy, Inc. is an American e-commerce company focused on handmade or vintage items and craft supplies. These items fall under a wide range of categories, including jewelry, bags, clothing, home décor and furniture, toys, art, as well as craft supplies and tools. Items described as vintage must be at least 20 years old. The site follows in the tradition of open craft fairs, giving sellers personal storefronts where they list their goods for a fee of US$0.20 per item.

, Etsy had over 100 million items in its marketplace, and the online marketplace for handmade and vintage goods connected 7.5 million sellers with 95.1 million buyers. At the end of 2022, Etsy had 2,790 employees. In 2022 Etsy had total sales, or Gross Merchandise Sales (GMS), of US$13.3 billion on the platform. In 2022, Etsy garnered a revenue of US$2.6 billion and registered a net loss of US$694 million. The platform generates revenue primarily from three streams: its Marketplace revenue includes a fee of 6.5% of final sale value, which an Etsy seller pays for each completed transaction, on top of a listing fee of 20 cents per item; Seller Services, Etsy's fastest growing revenue stream, includes fees for services such as "Promoted Listings", payment processing, and purchases of shipping labels through the platform; while Other revenue includes fees received from third-party payment processors.

General

Selling 
Creating a shop on Etsy requires creating and posting at least one listing in the shop which costs $0.20. Each listing will remain on the shop's page for a maximum of 4 months, or until someone buys the product. The prices of products are set by the shop owner, but Etsy claims 6.5% of the final sale price of listing and 5% of postal fee. Shop owners are sent a bill at the end of every month detailing the fees Etsy has charged them, and they have until the 15th of the following month to pay the fees. Sellers can choose which payment options to offer buyers, including credit cards, debit cards, and PayPal, among others.

Buying 
On the Etsy homepage potential buyers can type a "product description" into the search bar, or, alternatively, they can "browse" through a list of options on the left side of the homepage, which includes Art, Home & Living, Jewelry, Women, Men, Kids, Vintage, Weddings, Craft Supplies, Trending Items, Gift Ideas, Mobile Accessories, and more. Furthermore, buyers may choose from a list of categories by clicking on the "categories" link under "More Ways to Shop". This will bring the user to a page of over 30 categories, each containing subcategories.

When a buyer views a product, they can choose to view the positive percentage feedback of each seller to determine the reliability of the shop. Once a buyer finds a product they would like to buy, they click "Add to Cart", and that product is added to their virtual "Shopping Cart". The buyer may then either continue shopping, or purchase the selected item. In order to purchase items, buyers do not have to have an account with Etsy, and can instead register with a Facebook or Google account.

Etsy has received criticism for its handling of customer data and privacy. , according to the "Privacy Policy" section on the website: "By using Etsy, you authorise Etsy to use your information in the United States, Ireland and any other country where Etsy operates".

Operations 

Etsy is popular as a side-business, as well as a place to buy goods made from recycled and upcycled materials, along with less expensive or more unusual versions of mass-produced items. The unique nature of many of the items for sale is part of their appeal to some shoppers. Product photos on Etsy tend to be editorial or artistic instead of commercial catalog style. Sellers can add 13 tags to their products to help buyers find them, and buyers can choose to search for items available locally. Etsy staffers publish lists of featured items.

Most sellers are women, who tend to be college-educated and in their twenties and thirties. Individual Etsy sellers decide which payment options to offer buyers; these options may include credit card, cheque, money order, PayPal, bank transfer, and Etsy gift card.

Etsy sellers range from hobbyists to professional artists who use the site to make a living. According to artists who have developed their Etsy stores into their primary jobs, scaling up production of handmade items can require more than full-time work, especially during the holiday shopping season.

Etsy's main office is in Dumbo, Brooklyn, and it has hosted open crafting classes in the "Etsy Labs". The site's technology, customer support, marketing, PR, business, and communications teams operate out of this office. Etsy Labs has a workspace that provides equipment and donated materials, where members gather to make items, take and teach workshops, and attend special events. Etsy also has an office in Berlin. In April 2012 Etsy announced that it was taking steps to hire more women engineers to improve the gender balance of its team, as a website with majority women users but few women engineers. By 2019, 30 percent of Etsy's engineers identified as "women or non-binary", and over 30 percent were people of color.

Etsy was one of the main members of the Handmade Consortium, a 2007 effort to encourage buying handmade holiday gifts. Etsy has partnered with the retail chain West Elm to sell some Etsy products in its stores. In December 2012, Etsy opened a temporary holiday storefront in SoHo, New York City. In 2019 the UK's first Etsy store was opened in Didcot, Oxfordshire. The store features over 50 local makers & small businesses and an eco refill station, selling packaging free groceries including dry foods, toiletries, and cleaning products.

History

2005–2014

The site was launched in 2005 by iospace, a small company composed of Robert Kalin, Chris Maguire, and Haim Schoppik. The initial version had taken two and a half months to build. Later Jared Tarbell joined the team. Former NPR executive Maria Thomas joined as COO in 2008, was promoted to CEO and left Etsy in December 2009.  Robert Kalin resumed his role as CEO from December 2009 until July 2011. Investors include Sean Meenan, Albert Wenger, Spencer and Judson Ain, Union Square Ventures, and founders of Flickr and Delicious.

Kalin said that he named the site Etsy because he "wanted a nonsense word because I wanted to build the brand from scratch. I was watching Fellini's 8 ½ and writing down what I was hearing. In Italian, you say etsi a lot. It means 'oh, yes' (actually it's "eh, si"). And in Latin and French, it means 'what if'." In Greek, Etsy means "just because".

In Etsy's first year, it attracted attention for frequently adding new tools and functionality to the site to help sellers gain exposure and traffic, including Adobe Flash-based visualizations and a taxonomy of categories with tags. Etsy passed $1.7 million in sales in May 2007.  On July 29, Etsy had its one-millionth sale and anticipated its two-millionth sale would occur mid-December 2007. In November 2007, buyers spent $4.3 million purchasing 300,000 items for sale on Etsy, an increase of 43 percent from October 2007. In June 2007, it expected to be profitable by the fall, but in December 2007 it was not a profitable company. In January 2008, Etsy received an additional $27 million in funding from Union Square Ventures, Hubert Burda Media, and Jim Breyer.

In February 2008, trouble at eBay, including a strike by some dissatisfied sellers, brought speculation that Etsy could be an increasing competitor. At the same time, however, some Etsy sellers expressed discontentment with how Etsy was handling complaints about stores. At the time, a comparison of the two websites included complaints that on Etsy, items are difficult to find, the interface "feels slow", and the buying and selling process is United States-centric. Other reviewers enjoyed using Etsy's specialized search options, including the "Shop Local" tool.

In July 2008, Rob Kalin ceded the position of CEO to Maria Thomas. Some longtime Etsy employees left the company in August 2008, including founders Haim Schoppik and Chris Maguire. In September 2008, Etsy hired Chad Dickerson, who formerly worked at Yahoo!, as Chief Technology Officer. The company acknowledged concerns about vendors selling other people's work as their own.

In April 2009, users organized an "etsyday" promotion on Twitter that brought extra attention to the site. As of May 2009, it had approximately 60 employees and sales of $10 to 13 million per month, possibly boosted by consumer interest in cheaper and more personalized goods due to the United States recession.

In March 2010, Kalin said that the company is profitable and "plans to go public, though not until at least next year". Financial statements required to be filed by Etsy in order to go public show that due to reinvestment of annually increasing gross profits in marketing, product development, and management, the company has not reported a net profit as of 2015.

In December 2010, Etsy said it had seven million registered users, and that it would continue to focus on a personal community feel as it grows larger, as that is part of what distinguishes it from eBay.

In March 2011, Etsy "introduced a Facebook-style social networking system called People Search...to help buyers and sellers connect with each other and become friends". By doing so, Etsy made any past purchase with feedback easily searchable, which caused many complaints. Etsy then made changes to the site to better guard information regarding users' purchases.

In July 2011, Chad Dickerson, CTO since September 2008, became CEO, upon the firing of Rob Kalin. Later CTOs were Kellan Elliot-McCrea and John Allspaw.

In April 2012, a newspaper article about Etsy covered its fraud detection efforts; Etsy had been criticized in the past for inconsistently applying its rules about items having to be handmade. Later in April 2012, the writer of Regretsy, a popular blog, did independent research into a specific featured vendor, Ecologica Malibu, and found evidence to accuse the vendor of being a reseller, which would be against the Etsy Terms of Service. The vendor asserted that it was in line with the Terms of Service, stating that the shop had simply failed to identify itself as a "collective" that included the work of several individuals, and many Etsy community members posted on the Etsy forum expressing unhappiness with the action (or lack of action) taken by Etsy. As of June 2012, the vendor's account is no longer active on Etsy.

In May 2012, Etsy raised $40 million in Series F funding, and announced the company had become a B Corp. This B Lab certification lapsed in 2017. Etsy's 2012 funds went towards expanding Etsy in international markets, including France, Germany, and Australia.

On October 1, 2013, Dickerson held an online Town Hall Meeting to announce that Etsy would now permit factory-made goods and drop shipping, provided the seller either designed or hired designers of the items, disclosed to Etsy their factory, disclosed that they used factories and took "ownership" of the process. In that meeting and afterward, Etsy claimed the meaning of the word "handmade" should be redefined to encompass factory made.

In June 2014, Etsy purchased A Little Market, a French e-commerce site for handmade goods, foods, and wine, for a mix of cash and stock valued at less than $100 million. At the time the acquisition was the company's largest.

2015: IPO and investor lawsuit 
On March 3, 2015, Etsy announced that it had filed for a $100 million IPO. As of 2015, Etsy generated transactions worth US$1.93 billion on its platform, which has 54 million members. Etsy went public on April 16, 2015, selling 13.3 million shares, while other stockholders including venture capital firms such as Accel and Acton Capital Partners were selling the rest. The company's valuation was $1.8 billion and raised $237 million in IPO proceeds.  Less than a month later, Etsy stock dropped more than 8%. The stock closed at $30 on its first day of trading on April 16 and dropped down to $20.32 as of May 11.

Shortly after the IPO in 2015, a group of investors filed a class action lawsuit against Etsy claiming fraud. The suit claimed that Etsy's CEO and officers failed to disclose numerous problems with the site which could affect the stock price, among them that "more than 5 percent of all merchandise for sale on Etsy’s website may be either counterfeit or constitute trademark or copyright infringement" and that "brands are increasingly pursuing sellers on Etsy for trademark or copyright infringement, jeopardizing listing fees and commissions". The suit also claimed that Etsy management knew of the rampant trademark and copyright infringement but did little to stop it, and in fact worked to hide this information from potential investors.

2016–present
In November 2016, Etsy disclosed that it paid US$32.5 million to purchase Blackbird Technologies, a startup that developed AI software used for shopping context/search applications. After experiencing a first-quarter loss in May 2017, Etsy replaced its chief executive and cut 8% of its workforce. In May 2017, Board member Josh Silverman was appointed CEO over Chad Dickerson, citing pressure from shareholders and poor profits.

In July 2019, Etsy acquired the music based marketplace Reverb for $275 million.

In April 2020, Etsy issues a call to all sellers on the site to start making cloth face masks to combat COVID-19. Masks accounted for around 11% of gross-merchandise sales in the third quarter, selling roughly 24 million. During the COVID-19 pandemic in 2020, shares in Etsy more than quadrupled, with the company's forward multiple going up around 90 times what analysts had expected from forward earning. Equity analyst at D.A. Davidson Tom Forte stated the pandemic gave customers incentive to return to the website multiple times, rather than the usual occasional purchase of a unique product.

On June 2, 2021, Etsy announced that it had agreed to acquire shopping app Depop, the global fashion resell marketplace for $1.63 billion.

In most locations where Etsy Payments is not available, new shops are unable to on board to Etsy. As of April 26, 2021, most sellers opening new shops on Etsy are required to on board with Etsy Payments, which brings limitations on creating new shops in some countries.

In June 2022, Etsy announced the upcoming August launch of a purchase protection program for buyers and sellers. The company stated that an item that arrives damaged, does not arrive or does not match a description, will be refunded in full for the buyer. Etsy also reported it would invest $25 million to cover the refunds for cases where the seller is not at fault for item damage or loss.

Ethos
In an interview in August 2013, CEO Chad Dickerson emphasized the importance of human interaction and meaning from creativity in regard to his perspective on Etsy. Dickerson described the website as "a platform that provides meaning to people, and an opportunity to validate their art, their craft", and after spending time with Etsy users, Dickerson learned that "all commerce is about real human interaction". Dickerson also provided a summation of Etsy that is a further reflection of the company's relationship- and meaning-based ethos: "At the end of every transaction, you get something real from a real person. There is an existential satisfaction to that."

Climate Impact 
In 2008, Etsy received a B Corporation certification but later lost it in 2017. This certification was a recognition of the company abiding by transparent and accountable practices, which includes environmental practices. The environmental impact from depends greatly on the individual seller usage of wholesale retailer and large manufacturers. In Etsy's Supplier Code of Conduct, it states that sellers are obligated to follow environmental laws and regulations and that sellers must conduct business in a sustainable and responsible manner. Esty's 2020 Climate Change Response outlines the company's annual plan for climate related issues and how it achieves the motto of "keep commerce human".  In 2019, the board that oversees climate change at Esty made a goal of becoming a carbon neutral company in 2020. To achieve this, Etsy is offering eco-friendly packaging to its sellers through a partnership with EcoEnclose. This provides sellers with the option to use certified 100% recycled packaging. Buyers are also given a carbon offsetting option when selecting shipping. Etsy, partnered with multiple companies including Apple, pledged to purchase 165 Megawatts of solar energy through Spotsylvania.  By 2025, Etsy's goal is to reduce energy intensity by 25%.

Competitors

As of March 2016, Etsy's top three competitors according to Hoovers Online are Amazon Handmade, Craigslist, and eBay. Etsy has been compared to "a crafty cross between Amazon and eBay", and to "your grandma's basement". Etsy also has a number of direct competitors. DaWanda, based in Germany, closed in August 2018, Druzza is a global competitor, Bonanza (formerly Bonanzle and 1000 Markets) is based in the United States and focuses on clothing and fashion, Zibbet and Made It which are based in Australia, iCraft is based in Canada, Artfire is based in the United States, and Moksi is an online craft marketplace targeted at South Africans, and offers unique African-made handcrafted goods and art. Tindie is based in Portland, Oregon, and focuses on technology and electronics. Apple Creek Lane, a Canadian-based online marketplace that focuses on health, fitness & wellness products. ArtYah, based in California, United States brought together sellers and consumers of handmade items, vintage and some craft supplies  prior to closing in December, 2019.

Asked about competitors, Etsy's European CEO said, "As far as I am concerned, the more people highlighting the value of supporting micro-producers and buying handmade and vintage directly from them, the better."

Seller issues

Privacy
In 2011, in an effort to add social networking features to Etsy, the company implemented features that allowed users to search other users' buying histories and to trace their purchasing transactions. Etsy thought this feature would allow Etsy users to connect to individuals with similar buying and/or selling histories and an automatic opt-in was applied to all users without the attainment of prior permission. Users of the service raised concerns over the feature's violation of privacy rights, but an official response was not released by the company.

Production outsourcing
On October 1, 2013, Etsy changed its policy to allow sellers to outsource production to third parties and factories and to use shipping or fulfillment services. The new rules allow products to be labeled "handmade" as long as the original idea for that item—or its "authorship" as C.E.O. Dickerson says—comes from its respective seller. Further, the policy changes allow Etsy businesses to hire as many employees as they deem necessary (including workers in different locations) and allow sellers to ship orders via third-party couriers rather than the post office.

The move has prompted at least one Etsy competitor to distinguish itself by committing never to sell manufactured items.

In September 2015, Etsy made further changes to its manufacturing policy with the launch of Etsy Manufacturing, a marketplace allowing sellers to connect with outside manufacturers to fabricate their products. Manufacturers must be reviewed and approved by Etsy to ensure they adhere to certain criteria, although Etsy will not conduct visits or in-person inspections. Sellers must apply and be approved to work with any partners listed on Etsy Manufacturing and are required to disclose their use of outside manufacturers on their pages.

Advertising requirements 
In February 2020, Etsy announced a new "risk free" product advertising program, replacing an existing system allowing sellers to purchase ads on platforms such as Google Shopping from within Etsy. The company will automatically purchase advertising for products on "high-traffic" websites, with sales generated by these leads subject to a 15% cut of revenue from the total of the order. Etsy expected at least "1 in 10" leads to come from these ads. All sellers will be automatically opted into this program, but sellers with an annual revenue of $10,000 or higher (which will be subject to a 12% cut instead) are required to participate and may not opt out. The system has faced criticism from sellers, who have characterized the new system as a means for the company to further siphon revenue from its sellers.

Permanence of reviews 
Etsy reviews are permanent, and Etsy does not fact-check reviews. Many sellers have complained about false or misleading statements in reviews.

Effects of banking sanctions 

On 10 March 2022, due to banking sanctions, Etsy blocked accounts of all Russian customers including those living abroad and delisted all their goods, with the message of "Expanding business restrictions in the sellers' region".

See also
 Vintage (design)
 Vintage clothing
 Tech companies in the New York City metropolitan region

References

External links

 

2005 establishments in New York City
2015 initial public offerings
Companies based in Brooklyn
Companies listed on the Nasdaq
American companies established in 2005
Internet properties established in 2005
Online marketplaces of the United States
Publicly traded companies based in New York City
Retail companies established in 2005